Iran competed at the 1972 Winter Olympics in Sapporo, Japan. Four athletes and three officials represented Iran in the 1972 Olympics.

Competitors

Results by event

Skiing

Alpine

Men

References

External links
Official Olympic Reports

Nations at the 1972 Winter Olympics
1972
Winter Olympics
Pahlavi Iran